Li Jiayue (born 8 June 1990) is a Chinese football defender, who plays in the Turkish Super League for Galatasaray S.K., and on the China women's national football team.

Club career

Galatasaray 
On 5 January 2023, the Turkish Women's Football Super League team was transferred to the Galatasaray club.

International goals

References

External links 
 

1990 births
Living people
Chinese women's footballers
China women's international footballers
2015 FIFA Women's World Cup players
Footballers from Shanghai
Women's association football defenders
Footballers at the 2014 Asian Games
Footballers at the 2018 Asian Games
Asian Games silver medalists for China
Asian Games medalists in football
Medalists at the 2018 Asian Games
Chinese expatriate sportspeople in South Korea
2019 FIFA Women's World Cup players
21st-century Chinese women
Chinese expatriate sportspeople in Turkey
Expatriate women's footballers in Turkey
Turkish Women's Football Super League players
Galatasaray S.K. women's football players